Hard is a town in the west of the westernmost Austrian state of Vorarlberg, directly on the southern shores of Lake Constance.
Hard's attractions include the Strandbad and the Grünerdamm.
Hard is also known for its skatepark.

An honorary consulate of Brazil is located in Hard.

Population

Geography 
Hard has an area of 17.46 km² (6.75 sq mi). Hard is also located between the two rivers Bregenzer Ach and Rhine, and borders on the provincial capital Bregenz.

History 
In the 7th century, Alemanni settled near Mittelweiherburg. Near Lake Constance, around the year 1200, large parts of the woods were cleared to build a village: Hard (Old High German for "forest"). The community of Hard was first mentioned in a charter from Pope Innocent IV to the monastery of Mehrerau in 1249.

In 1794, Samuel Vogel from Alsace opened the first Hard textile factory. In 1802, the "Allmenden" (common grounds) were suspended, resulting in private fields, pastures and forests. In 1997, the textile printing museum in Mittelweiherburg was opened.

Harder Schwabenkinder (Swabian children) 

From the 17th century to the beginning of the 20th century, many poor Vorarlberg farmers sent their children to Swabia, Southern Germany, to do seasonal work there. These children were called "Schwabenkinder", the undertaking itself was referred to as "Schwabengehen".

Heraldry 
The coat of arms of Hard shows two trees and a sailboat. They symbolize important early activities in Hard: logging and fishing.

References

External links
Town of Hard

Cities and towns in Bregenz District
Populated places on Lake Constance